Clifford Alan King is an electrical engineer with L-3 Communications of Gloucester, Massachusetts. King was named a Fellow of the Institute of Electrical and Electronics Engineers (IEEE) in 2012 for his contributions to silicon germanium heterojunction devices and technologies.

References

Fellow Members of the IEEE
Living people
Year of birth missing (living people)
Place of birth missing (living people)
American electrical engineers